WOEZ (93.7 FM) is a radio station broadcasting a soft adult contemporary format and licensed to Burton, South Carolina, United States. The station is currently owned by Saga Communications, through licensee Saga South Communications, LLC.

History
The station went on the air as WONO on April 19, 1991. On May 15, 1996, the station changed its call sign to WALI.

WALI was owned by Hess Communications LLC.

Wally 93.7 played country music and had an alligator mascot. The station signed off in 2012. Palmetto Rural Telephone, through Premier Enterprises, LLC, bought the station on January 17, 2014 for $375,000 and changed it to hot adult contemporary "I93.7". Miles Crosby, called "Uncle Miles" on Charleston's WAVF played a major role in planning the new format and hosted the morning show, which included news and music as well as "Swap Shop". The music included Train, Adele, Edwin McCain and Darius Rucker. Other programming included high school football, Atlanta Braves baseball, Clemson football and NASCAR.

Effective May 1, 2017, Premier Enterprises sold WALI to Apex Media Corporation for $325,000.

On May 24, 2017, WALI went silent. Effective September 1, 2017, Saga Communications purchased WALI, seven of its sister stations, and four translators from Apex Media for $23 million. Coincident with the purchase, WALI changed their call letters to WOEZ and on September 6, 2017, WOEZ returned to the air with a soft adult contemporary format, branded as "Easy FM 93.7", previously heard on the HD2 channel of WVSC and its translators.  On December 13, 2017, WOEZ moved from Walterboro to Burton, South Carolina.

On May 5, 2022, Saga Communications (parent of WOEZ) Chairman/CEO/President Ed Christian revealed a new programming initiative which launched on this station in May 2022. Its purposes are to bring back overnight listening and help its listeners who have trouble sleeping. Much of the overnight hours (11 p.m. to 5 a.m. Eastern) will consist of nature sounds ( gentle rain and thunder) with short sponsorships twice an hour. WOEZ is the prototype station for the nature sounds specialty programming now known as "EZ Sleep".

References

External links

OEZ
Soft adult contemporary radio stations in the United States
Radio stations established in 1993
1993 establishments in South Carolina